The 2015 Pittsburgh Panthers football team represented the University of Pittsburgh in the 2015 NCAA Division I FBS football season. The Panthers were led by first year head coach Pat Narduzzi and played their home games at Heinz Field. They were a member of the Coastal Division of the Atlantic Coast Conference (ACC). This was Pitt's third season as a member of the ACC. They finished the season 8–5, 6–2 in ACC play to finish in second place in the Coastal Division. They were invited to the Military Bowl where they lost to Navy.

Schedule

Rankings

Coaching staff

Team players drafted into the NFL

References

Pittsburgh
Pittsburgh Panthers football seasons
Pittsburgh Panthers football